The Redlands District Rugby League Football Club was formed in 1950 and plays out of Pinklands Reserve, in Thornlands, Queensland.

Redlands seniors compete in the Brisbane Rugby League and the Brisbane Second Division Rugby League while the junior teams compete in the Greater Brisbane Junior Rugby League.

The nickname of the club comes from the large flocks of rainbow lorikeets that live in the Redlands area.

References

External links
 Club website
 Junior Facebook page

Rugby clubs established in 1950
1950 establishments in Australia
Rugby league teams in Brisbane
Redland City